Martin Julian Goldsmith (born August 18, 1952) is an American radio personality and an author, best known as a classical music host on National Public Radio and Sirius XM, and for a book about his parents' experiences as Jewish musicians in Nazi Germany.

Biography
Born in St. Louis, Missouri, Goldsmith is the son of Gunther Goldschmidt, a flutist from Oldenburg, Germany, and Rosemarie Gumpert Goldschmidt, a violist.  After emigrating to the United States, his mother was for 21 years a member of the St. Louis Symphony Orchestra. Goldsmith received a bachelor's degree from Johns Hopkins.  From 1971 to 1975 he was a radio host, musical producer, and writer at classical radio station WCLV, in Cleveland, Ohio.  He joined WETA-FM, Washington, D.C., in 1975, serving as producer, announcer, music director, and, eventually, program director.  In 1987 he joined National Public Radio as a music producer for Performance Today.  From 1989 to 1999 he hosted that program; he became its senior commentator in 1999.  He then moved to XM Satellite Radio, where he serves as director of classical music programming and is frequently heard on Sirius XM's Symphony Hall channel. Goldsmith has sung in the chorus of the Baltimore Opera Company and made a guest appearance with the Washington Opera. He has also acted in many roles in Washington-area theaters, including Arena Stage.  He plays the French horn. His music reviews have appeared in The Washington Post.

Books

The Inextinguishable Symphony: A True Story of Music and Love in Nazi Germany, John Wiley & Sons, 2001,  - details his parents' experiences in the Jüdischer Kulturbund, an all-Jewish orchestra maintained by the Nazis between 1933 and 1941. 
The Beatles Come to America Wiley, 2004,

Film
Winter journey (Winterreise), a 2019 documentary with feature film elements starring Bruno Ganz by Danish director Anders Østergaard. The film is based on Goldsmiths' book The Inextinguishable Symphony. Goldsmith is narrating the story.

Awards
Goldsmith's awards include Yale's Cultural Leadership Citation (1998) and, for Performance Today, a George Foster Peabody Award (1998).

References

External links

1952 births
American male non-fiction writers
American writers about music
American radio personalities
Classical music radio presenters
Jewish American writers
Living people
Radio personalities from St. Louis
21st-century American Jews